Arnetta verones, the Sumatran bob, is a species of butterfly in the family Hesperiidae. It was described by William Chapman Hewitson in 1878. It is found in Malaysia and on Borneo and Sumatra.

References

Butterflies described in 1878
v
Butterflies of Malaysia
Butterflies of Indonesia
Taxa named by William Chapman Hewitson